Antonio Casas (11 November 1911 – 14 February 1982) was a Spanish footballer turned film actor who appeared in film between 1941 and his death in 1982.

Casas originally began as a footballer for Atlético Madrid, but entered film in 1941 and made nearly 170 appearances in film and TV between then and 1982. He appeared in A Pistol for Ringo in 1965 and Sergio Leone's Spaghetti Western The Good, the Bad and the Ugly in 1966. One of his best-known roles was in Luis Buñuel's Tristana.

In the early 1970s he worked in television but returned to film after 1975 until his death.

He died on 14 February 1982 in Madrid at age 70.

Filmography

References

External links
 

1911 births
1982 deaths
People from A Coruña
Spanish footballers
Footballers from A Coruña
Atlético Madrid footballers
Spanish male film actors
Male Western (genre) film actors
Male Spaghetti Western actors
20th-century Spanish male actors
Association footballers not categorized by position